In music, Op. 64 stands for Opus number 64. Compositions that are assigned this number include:

 Britten – A Midsummer Night's Dream
 Chopin – Minute Waltz, Op. 64, No. 1
 Chopin – Waltz in A-flat major, Op. 64, No. 3
 Chopin – Waltz in C-sharp minor, Op. 64, No. 2
 Dvořák – Dimitrij
 Grieg – Symphonic Dances
 Haydn – String Quartets, Op. 64
 Mendelssohn – Violin Concerto
 Prokofiev – Romeo and Juliet
 Schumann – Romanzen & Balladen volume IV (3 songs)
 Scriabin – Piano Sonata No. 7
 Sibelius – The Bard
 Tchaikovsky – Symphony No. 5